Aphetoceras is a genus of tarphycerid cephalopod within the Estonioceratidae; loosely coiled without an impression along the dorsal margin; early whorls barely reaching, separating then diverging in the final mature whorl; weakly ribbed in some. The cross section of Aphetoceras is higher than wide, making it compressed in form. The dorsum, along the inner curve, is more broadly rounded than the venter which lies along the outer curve. The siphuncle is relatively large, located near but not at the ventral margin; lined with secondary deposits. Chambers are empty.

Aphetoceras is similar in outline to the related Estonioceras and Alaskoceras but most similar in cross section to Clytoceras.

Aphetoceras comes from the Lower Ordovician of North America and Australia and is one of the earlier tarphycerids found in the Lower Ordovician El Paso Group in New Mexico.

References

 Aphetoceras, p K358 in Vol K of the Treatise on Invertebrate Paleontology in the section on the Estonioceratidae, p K357-K359, included in the Chapter on the Tarphycerida by Furnish and Glenister starting with page K343.

Prehistoric nautiloid genera
Ordovician cephalopods
Ordovician cephalopods of North America
Paleozoic life of Newfoundland and Labrador
Paleozoic life of Quebec